Persemi Mimika is an Indonesian amateur football club based in Timika, Mimika Regency, Central Papua. The name Persemi is an abbreviation of Persatuan Sepakbola Mimika (English: Football Association of Mimika). The club plays in the Liga 3.

References

External links
Liga-Indonesia.co.id

Football clubs in Indonesia
Football clubs in Central Papua
Association football clubs established in 1996
1996 establishments in Indonesia